Paleo-Laplandic is a hypothetical group of extinct but related  languages spoken in Sápmi (northern Scandinavia). A considerable amount of words in Sámi languages originate from Paleo-Laplandic; more than 1,000 loanwords from Paleo-Laplandic likely exist. Many toponyms in Sápmi originate from Paleo-Laplandic. Because Sámi language etymologies for reindeers have preserved a large number of words from Paleo-Laplandic, this suggests that Paleo-Laplandic groups influenced Sámi culture.

Due to irregular correspondences in Sámi loanwords from Paleo-Laplandic, it can be theorized that the words were borrowed from distinct but related languages that were characterized in the west by an s-type sibilant, while in the east it was an š-type sibilant.

Many words relating to the environment or reindeer such as ája ("spring") are likely loanwords from Paleo-Laplandic into Sámi. The substrate words have no apparent parallels to any known language. Linguist  compared them with the Pre-Germanic substrate words but found no similarities aside from a distinction between central and peripheral accentuation.

See also 
Pre-Finno-Ugric substrate

References 

Unclassified languages of Europe
Extinct languages of Europe